Vasyl Vsevolod Velychkovsky (June 1, 1903 – June 30, 1973) was a priest, and later bishop, of the Ukrainian Greek Catholic Church, one of the Eastern Catholic Churches in communion with Rome.  He is a martyr of the Catholic Church, dying in 1973 of his injuries sustained while imprisoned by the Soviet Union for his Christian faith.

Velychkovsky was born in Stanislaviv, in then-Austria-Hungary. In 1920 he entered the seminary in Lviv, then in Poland. In 1925 he took his first religious vows in the village of Holosko near Lviv in the Congregation of the Most Holy Redeemer (better known as the Redemptorists) and was ordained a priest. As a priest-monk Vasyl Velychkovsky taught and preached in Volyn, a Ukrainian-majority province in interwar Poland. In 1942 he became abbot of the monastery in German-occupied Ternopil. Because of religious persecution by the Communist Soviet Union he was arrested in 1945 by the NKVD and sent to Kiev. The punishment of death was commuted to 10 years of hard labor.

On release in 1955 he went back to Lviv, and was ordained a bishop in 1963. In 1969 he was imprisoned again for three years for his religious activities. Released in 1972, he was exiled outside the USSR. He died of his injuries from prison in Winnipeg, Manitoba, Canada on June 30, 1973, aged 70.

Thirty years after his death, Vasyl Velychkovsky's body was found to be almost incorrupt (his toes had fallen off and were subsequently divided to be used as holy relics). Beatified in 2001, the intact remains of Vasyl Velychkovsky are enshrined at St. Joseph's Ukrainian Catholic Church in Winnipeg, Manitoba, Canada.  Today, his shrine is located at 250 Jefferson Avenue, Winnipeg, Manitoba.

References

External links 
 Biography of Blessed Vasyl on CSSR Official Website 

Bishops of the Ukrainian Greek Catholic Church
Soviet prisoners sentenced to death
Prisoners sentenced to death by the Soviet Union
Prisoners and detainees of the Soviet Union
1903 births
1973 deaths
Religious leaders from Ivano-Frankivsk
People from the Kingdom of Galicia and Lodomeria
Ukrainian Austro-Hungarians
20th-century Eastern Catholic martyrs
20th-century venerated Christians
Eastern Catholic beatified people
Beatified Redemptorists
Redemptorist bishops
Soviet expatriates in Canada
Beatifications by Pope John Paul II
Soviet beatified people
Soviet Eastern Catholics
Ukrainian Soviet Socialist Republic people
Ukrainians in Poland
Polish abbots
Polish priests
Ukrainian people exiled by the Soviet Union
Victims of anti-religious campaign in the Soviet Union